Monte Bignone is a mountain in Liguria, northern Italy, part of the Ligurian Alps.  It is located in the province of Imperia near Sanremo. It lies at an altitude of 1299 metres and lies within the San Romolo Natural Park.

SOIUSA classification 
According to the SOIUSA (International Standardized Mountain Subdivision of the Alps) the mountain can be classified in the following way:
 main part = Western Alps
 major sector = South Western Alps
 section = Ligurian Alps
 subsection = Alpi del Marguareis
 supergroup = Catena del Saccarello
 group = Gruppo del Monte Saccarello
 subgroup = Costiera Ceppo-Bignone
 code = I/A-1.II-A.1.e

Nature conservation 
The mountain and its surrounding area are included in a SIC (Site of Community Importance) called Monte Nero - Monte Bignone (code: IT1315806 ).

References

Mountains of the Ligurian Alps
Mountains of Liguria
Province of Imperia
One-thousanders of Italy
Natura 2000 in Italy